Burning Kisses is a 2010 Vietnamese film; it is one of the few Vietnamese musical films, and features a high-profile Vietnamese cast.

Synopsis
The story is about a group of staff and employees from a resort in Nha Trang, Vietnam. The resort hosts a famous boy band to perform for them in order to keep their business. However, things turn out unexpectedly when the employees have to do the show themselves, and everybody has a chance to show their talents.

References

 Những nụ hôn rực rỡ - ai cũng có thể hi vọng
 Dàn sao Những nụ hôn rực rỡ sau 7 năm : Người thành công, kẻ lận đận ở ẩn

External links
 

2010 films
Vietnamese musical films
2010s musical films